Volterra may refer to the following:

 Volterra, a town in Italy

People:
 Aaron Ḥai Volterra, Italian poet and rabbi
 Daniele da Volterra (1509–1566), an Italian painter
 Francesco da Volterra, a 14th-century Italian painter
 Vito Volterra (1860–1940), an Italian mathematician

In mathematics: 
 Lotka–Volterra equations, also known as the predator–prey equations
 The Smith–Volterra–Cantor set, a Cantor set with measure greater than zero
 Volterra's function, a differentiable function whose derivative is not Riemann integrable
 Volterra integral equation, a generalization of the indefinite integral
 Volterra operator, a bounded linear operator on the space of square integrable functions, the operator corresponding to an indefinite integral
 Volterra series
 Volterra space, a property of topological spaces

Other:
 Volterra Semiconductor, an American semiconductor company
 Volterra (crater), a lunar impact crater on the far side of the Moon